Kevin Bisse (born 21 July 1995) is a Swedish footballer who plays as a midfielder.

Career

Kevin Bisse started his football career with the Södertälje club Syrianska, but played five seasons in his youth with IF Brommapojkarna before going back to Syrianska in 2009.

He debuted in Allsvenskan during the 2013 season and played eleven games that year. He scored his first senior goal in Superettan on August 18, 2014.

In December 2014, Syrianska announced that Bisse had completed a move to Süper Lig club Karabükspor on loan for the remainder of the 2014–15 season. Karabükspor had an option to buy him out from Syrianska when the loan deal was over. Bisse suffered an injury in the beginning of 2015 and got transferred back to Syrianska without representing Karabükspor.

Career statistics

Club

References

External links

1995 births
Living people
Swedish footballers
Assyrian footballers
Allsvenskan players
Superettan players
Syrianska FC players
AFC Eskilstuna players
Association football midfielders
People from Södertälje
Sportspeople from Stockholm County